Featherstone Rovers are a professional rugby league club in Featherstone, West Yorkshire, England, who play in the Championship. Featherstone is a former coal mining town with a population of around 16,000 and Rovers are one of the last "small town teams" which were common in rugby league in the early 20th century. The club has produced many junior players who have gone on to play for Super League clubs. Their local rivals are Castleford and Wakefield Trinity, and in the Championship, Halifax.

The club have won the Challenge Cup three times, in 1967, 1973 and 1983, and been League Champions once, in 1977.

History

1889–1902: Origins
Featherstone Trinity RUFC were formed in 1889. Featherstone Trinity played their first game on the New Inn fields against Castleford Mill Lane Rovers. The following season in 1890, Featherstone went 19 games without defeat. They dropped the Trinity to become simply Featherstone RUFC in 1894. Featherstone voted to join the Northern Union in 1898 and became the town's first rugby league team. Featherstone played in the following competitions the Charlesworth Cup (1889 to 1905), the Dunhill Cup. (1890 to 1894) and the Yorkshire Second Competition (1898 to 1902). They folded in 1902.

1902–1945: Foundation
A new club, Featherstone Rovers, was formed in the Railway Hotel in 1902, reformed in 1906 and joined the Northern Union in 1907. Initially the club played in the Dewsbury, Wakefield & District League (1919 to 1921) as well as the Yorkshire Combination (1905 to 1912) and The Yorkshire Junior Cup (1909 to 1921). The club was originally made up of local miners and between 1912 and 1913 played at the Featherstone Main Colliery Welfare Ground. In 1913 Featherstone Rovers merged with Purston White Horse.

To bolster the ranks of the war time league, Featherstone Rovers along with Brighouse Rangers and St Helens Recs were promoted from district leagues to join the senior clubs for the duration of the conflict, although Featherstone only lasted one season.

After the First World War, Featherstone took part in the Leeds & District League (1913 to 1921) and the Wakefield & District League (1919 to 1921).

Featherstone became a semi-professional club on 14 June 1921, beating Bradford Northern in their first game as a senior club. Their first game at Post Office Road attracted 4,000 fans. The finished 24th in their first season. They then finished 12th, 23rd, 17th, 15th, 11th and 3rd in 1927–28

Rovers reached the Championship final after just seven seasons, losing 11–0 to Swinton in the 1928 final. Rovers ended the 1928–29 season finishing 25th, although they reached a cup final, beaten by Leeds in the Yorkshire Cup decider. The 1930s were a poor decade for Featherstone, finishing in the bottom half of the league in every season, and finishing bottom three times.

Rovers' first major silverware was won in 1939–40, when they lifted the Yorkshire County Cup. They finished 7th in the Yorkshire Emergency War League both in 1939–40 and 1940–41. The counties united in 1941–42 and Rovers finished 12th. They were a mid table side during these few years finishing 8th, 13th and 14th.

Post-war

As Rovers emerged from the Second World War in 1945, results were not as good as hoped finishing 13th in the first season post-war, they then finished in bottom few places in the league for the next few years. After two seasons in charge, former player Bill Sherwood gave way to a new coach, and the committee decided to go for a big name, which turned out to be Stan Smith.

Rovers made a bright start and won their opening three fixtures, however, after beating Batley in November, Rovers lost 24 straight games and won only once more in the rest of the season, by which time Stan Smith had left the club. Bill Sherwood re-assumed the coaching role for three more seasons until 1951.

Eric Batten came in as player-coach in the summer of 1951. From rock bottom strugglers, Featherstone were gradually transformed into a fit and competitive side, capable of matching the best in the league on their day. Rovers' first visit to Wembley Stadium was in the 1952 Challenge Cup Final, the first to be televised. They were defeated 18–10 by Workington Town in front of a crowd of 72,093.

In the summer of 1956 Rovers allowed Batten to leave the club and appointed a new coach, Bill Hudson. Hudson left towards the end of the season in March. The explanation being that Hudson could no longer commit himself to the job having moved out of the local area. Rovers decided against appointing a new coach mid-season and played out the 1956–57 season without a coach.

Harold Moxon took over and Rovers finished 8th in the league, up from 15th the previous season. In subsequent years, Rovers came 13th, 5th, 9th, 3rd and 11th. The club had previously managed a top ten finish on just three occasions (in 1928, 1955 and 1956). Rovers managed four Challenge Cup semi-finals in five years but lost all of them. They did, however, win the Yorkshire Cup in 1959 after a tight victory over Hull; the last time Rovers ever won that famous old trophy before it was abandoned in 1993. Just eleven days after that success, Rovers beat Australia 23–15 in a tour match.

In 1959, the club's record attendance was set at 17,531 for a third round Challenge Cup match against St. Helens. This was more than the population of the village of Featherstone

Moxon's coaching career ended in the summer of 1963.

1960s

Johnny Malpass took over as coach of the Featherstone Rovers in August 1963. In his first season, Malpass steered Rovers to fourth in the table, other highlights that year included beating the Australian tourists for a second successive time. The next seasons Rovers finished 15th and Malpass quit as coach after a heavy defeat by St Helens in the play-offs.

Laurie Gant took over from Johnny Malpass as Rovers coach in the summer of 1966. Rovers finished 20th in the league in 1966–67 but Rovers' won the Challenge Cup in 1967. Despite their lowly league position they defeated Bradford Northern, Wakefield Trinity, Castleford and Leeds to get to Wembley Stadium. Barrow provided the opposition in the final where a crowd of 77,000 paid a then record £54,435 to watch the game. Rovers won the match 17–12. Only Widnes in 1937 had accomplished the feat from a lower position in the league table. Featherstone Rovers also reached the final of the Yorkshire Cup but were beaten 25–12 by Hull Kingston Rovers.

In 1968–69 the side finally began to put together some consistent league form and finished 7th followed by 8th the following year and a Yorkshire Cup final defeat 12–9 to Hull. Rovers featured in a 1969 BBC documentary 'The Game that Got Away' which profiled the state of rugby league in 1969 and the on and off-field fortunes of Rovers.

1970s

They reached the Yorkshire Cup final again in 1970, losing to Leeds 23–7.

Peter Fox took over as coach mid-season from Laurie Gant in December 1970. He won only six games of his first 22 in charge but Rovers recovered to finish seventh in the league the following season.

This was followed by a then best ever finish of second in 1973. Rovers repeated the feat of six years earlier, when Bradford Northern were beaten 33–14 in the 1973 Challenge Cup final. Cyril Kellett's 8-goals for Featherstone Rovers against Bradford Northern in the final is still a record that has only been matched by Iestyn Harris for Leeds Rhinos against London Broncos 1999 final.

The following season Rovers dropped back to eighth but enjoyed a Wembley return to the 1974 Challenge Cup final. Following a defeat by Warrington, Fox left and was replaced by former player Tommy Smales.

In 1974–75 Tommy Smales quit due to the pressures of work, and Rovers turned to Keith Goulding. They then finished 8th, 4th and were runners up again in 1975–76, pipped by just a single point to the title, coach Keith Goulding leaving mid-season to be replaced by another Tommy Smales, unrelated to the coach of the same name who had been in charge of Featherstone a few years earlier.

Keith Cotton took over, as Smales stepped down, in the summer of 1976. Rovers were crowned Division One champions in 1976/77, their greatest season, winning 21 games out of 30 and finishing 5 points clear of nearest rivals St Helens. They also reached the Yorkshire Cup final, losing to Leeds 16–12.

In 1977–78 Rovers finished 7th and again reached the Yorkshire Cup final but were beaten 17–7 by Castleford. Head coach Keith Cotton quit and Keith Goulding filled in for the rest of 1977–78. Rovers persuaded veteran forward Terry Clawson to take on the player-coach's role. Rovers won just two of their first ten games. A heavy loss at Rochdale convinced everyone it was time for a change and Clawson quit. He was replaced by former club loose forward Tommy Smales. They were relegated only two years after their title win.

1980s and early 1990s

Featherstone won promotion from the Second Division in 1980 under coach Paul Daley. Featherstone Rovers secured the first ever British rugby league shirt sponsorship deal during the 1981–82 season. LinPac Packaging appeared on the Featherstone Rovers jersey and were the main sponsor of the club until 1989. Daley resigned in January 1981 despite Rovers winning ten of their opening 16 fixtures and in came Vince Farrar. Featherstone did just enough to stay up in the end finishing just two points ahead of relegated Halifax.

Rovers made a poor start in the league were facing relegation when Vince Farrar was sacked in November 1982. Allan Agar joined Featherstone as captain-coach in December; Featherstone Rovers won the Challenge Cup as underdogs on 7 May 1983 beating Hull F.C. 14–12 in front of an 84,969 Wembley crowd. Steve Quinn secured their victory with a late penalty goal.

The following season (1984–85) saw a slight upturn in the club's fortunes whilst off-field the town struggled through the miners' strike of 1984–85. The club allowed pass holders in for that season free with the understanding they would pay for their passes when the strike had ended. David Hobbs was sold to Oldham to balance the club's books. When the following season started in a similar vein, a heavy defeat at Wigan triggered the resignation of Allan Agar.

George Pieniazek arrived as replacement, Rovers had started the 1985–86 season badly but managed to stay up under their new coach. Rovers started the next season badly as well and Pieniazek was sacked in November. Paul Daley came in as coach for the second time but failed to turn the team around mid-season and Featherstone Rovers were relegated in April 1987 for the second time in their history.

Peter Fox returned to the club for a second spell as coach in 1987 and stayed until 1991. They won promotion at the first attempt in 1987–88 before finishing 6th on their return to the top-flight. Featherstone sold Post Office Road to the local council in February 1988. In 1989 Rovers reached the Yorkshire Cup final for the 10th and last time losing 20–14 to Bradford Northern. Another successful league campaign in 1990–91 saw Rovers finish 7th and go to the semi-finals of the Premiership with a famous win at all-conquering Wigan.

Not long into the following season, Fox accepted the offer of a job at Bradford, the club turned once again to former captain-coach Allan Agar. Rovers struggled for consistency through the rest of 1991–92 and then were relegated on points difference through a remarkable combination of results on the final day of the season. Steve Martin became the coach and Rovers won the Second Division title in 1992–93.

They finished 11th in their return to the top division in 1993–94. Martin was sacked and replaced by David Ward. Despite finishing 11th in the league, and appearing in the Challenge Cup semi-final, Rovers were demoted in 1995 to make way for the new "Super League".

1996–2006: Summer era and financial difficulties
In 1996, the first tier of British rugby league clubs played the inaugural Super League season and changed from a winter to a summer season. When a Rupert Murdoch-funded Super League competition was proposed, part of the deal was that some traditional clubs would merge. Featherstone Rovers were asked to merge with local rivals Castleford and Wakefield Trinity to form a new club, Calder, which would compete in the Super League. Trinity's shareholders voted 2:1 in favour of a merger but Featherstone's members voted against by a large margin and this was resisted.

In 1995 Rovers finished 11th in the 16-team First Division but were effectively relegated to make way for London Broncos and Paris Saint-Germain. They reached the semi finals of the Challenge Cup in 1995 before losing to Leeds 39–22. They finished 5th in the 1st Division of the centenary season of 1995–96, followed by 4th in the first summer season. A poor start to the 1997 season led Ward to offer his resignation, which the club reluctantly accepted.

Steve Simms came in as coach and after finishing 7th in 1997, Featherstone went within a whisker of gaining Super League status in 1998. They were beaten 24–22 by neighbours Wakefield Trinity in the promotion-deciding inaugural First Division grand final. When it became apparent that funds would not be available to continue the push for Super League in 1999, Simms resigned.

Assistant coach Kevin Hobbs took over; at the beginning of the 1999 season a new side had to be built. A decent start saw Rovers win five straight league games, but then lose the next three. After defeat at Doncaster, Kevin Hobbs quit his post, citing verbal abuse his family had received from some fans.

Peter Roe was in charge of Featherstone from 1999 to October 2001, before leaving to take charge of Wakefield Trinity. Under him, Rovers finished 5th in 1999 and 2000 and 4th in 2001. He was replaced by his assistant Ian Fairhurst.

After finishing 5th again, in November 2002, Featherstone went into administration, owing the Inland Revenue £97,000 and with total debts of £403,000.

In September 2003, Andy Kelly's contract was not renewed following their failure to reach the National League One play-offs for the first time in six years, finishing 7th.

Rovers again finished 5th in 2004, and after heroically beating Hull Kingston Rovers 19–18 in the play-offs, lost to Whitehaven in the Final eliminator.

In 2005, David Hobbs was appointed coach of Featherstone Rovers half-way through the season after Gary Price left, he failed to save Rovers from relegation to National League Two.

In late 2006, the "Friends of Featherstone" were formed, their main aim being to provide money for contracts for players to ensure that Rovers gained promotion to National League One. The money raised enabled Rovers to sign players such as Paul Handforth, Chris Ross, Tom Haughey, Jamie Field and Loz Wildbore.

Their first season in the third tier of Rugby League was not a success, finishing 4th and losing to Swinton in the play-offs.

2007–2008: Promotion to the Championship

In 2007 after finishing runners up in the league to big spending Crusaders, Rovers won promotion back to National League One (The Second level on the pyramid) from National League Two after a two-year absence with a 24–6 win over Oldham at Headingley.

Featherstone finished 8th on their return to the second tier of Rugby League.

As of the start of the 2009 season clubs wishing to participate in the Super League competition have to gain a licence granted by the Rugby Football League removing promotion to and relegation from the top tier. Featherstone did apply for the first round of licences though with the popular view this would not be successful and could be used as a learning experience for future bids. In July 2008 the RFL made its decision selection all current Super League teams plus two from the National Leagues, Salford and Celtic Crusaders.

In November 2010 it was announced by Rovers that they would not be applying for a super league licence for the 2012 season. Although Rovers have ambitions to play in Super League, they say they are not yet in a position to apply for a licence. They accept they have to increase their support base before they are able to make a realistic application.

2009–2013: Daryl Powell era

Daryl Powell was appointed coach in September 2008 and gave Rovers a fantastic end to the 2009 season. After finishing 6th and only just getting in the play-offs Rovers beat Sheffield Eagles and Widnes away before a cruel 32–30 loss in the final eliminator to Halifax.

In 2010, Rovers finished first in the league table with a 100% away record and claimed the League Leaders' Shield. They reached the Championship Grand Final by beating Halifax 46–16 in the semi-final. They went on to lose the final to Halifax 23–22 in extra time.
The close season saw the departure of club chief executive Andy Prout to be replaced by Stuart Sheard.

In 2011 Featherstone went one better than 2010 by beating Sheffield Eagles 40–4 in the Grand Final at the Halliwell Jones Stadium in Warrington as well as retaining the League Leaders' Shield in the regular season.

On 14 April 2012 Featherstone beat their local rivals Castleford 23–16 in the Challenge Cup 4th Round. The victory, the first for a lower-league side over a Super League club since Barrow defeated Cas in 2010, was televised nationally on Sky Sports. Rovers hosted Cup holders Wigan in the fifth round, putting up a competitive display, and making Wigan work hard before succumbing to a 32–16 defeat. They reached the final of the Northern Rail Cup for the first time, losing to Halifax 21–15. They won the League Leaders' Shield for the third year in a row, before losing in the grand final 20–16 to Sheffield Eagles.

2013 started brightly, challenging for the title again with impressive league wins against rivals Halifax and Batley as well as a memorable narrow Challenge Cup defeat by Super League London Broncos. Daryl Powell, the most successful coach in the clubs recent history, left the club on 5 May.

2014–present: Super League bid

After Daryl Powell left, a string of coaches followed. Ryan Sheridan was in charge for 8 games, before Sean Long took over as football manager with Danny Evans as first team coach. Together they helped the club win the League Leaders' Shield again before losing the play off semi final in extra time to Batley. John Bastien then took over for 2014 but was sacked after 11 games and a number of poor performances.

In mid-2014 the RFL announced a new structure to be in place for the 2015 season. Super League was to be reduced to 12 teams, with 12 teams in the Championship and 14 in League 1. Promotion and relegation was to be brought back via a 'qualifier' league at the end of the season where the bottom four teams in Super League and the top four teams in the Championship would play each other to determine who would be in Super League the following season.

Andy Hay was appointed as head coach in May 2014. Despite off-field turmoil, he managed to guide the club to 2nd place in the league and a place in the Grand Final against Leigh, although they lost 36–12. An inconsistent run of results led him to be sacked in July 2015.

Jon Sharp took over and having missed out on the top four, won the Championship Shield in his first year in charge, defeating London Broncos 36–4. In 2016, Rovers finished in the top 4, although they lost all seven games in the qualifiers. Rovers again reached the top four in 2017, however Sharp was sacked with one game remaining in the regular season.

In the 2019 Championship season, Featherstone reached the Million Pound Game against Toronto Wolfpack but were defeated 24-6.
On 10 October 2021, Featherstone once again reached the Million Pound Game with the opponents this time being French side Toulouse Olympique.  Featherstone trailed 16-0 at half-time before losing the match 34-12.
On 28 May 2022, Featherstone reached the final of the 2022 RFL 1895 Cup against Leigh but lost 30-16.

Kit sponsors and manufacturers

Stadium

Late 2008 saw a major announcement in the history of Featherstone Rovers, a possible move away from Post Office Road. Featherstone are in a rare situation, that they own an expanse of land around the current stadium. The proposed development would include a supermarket, community sports facilities and a purpose-built 12,000 capacity stadium though this could be reduced to a 6,500 modular design. Should it be needed the capacity can be increased to the required 12,000 if the club bid successfully for 2015 or 2018. Though more recent plans on the website state that the club "see the provision of a 21st century stadium through the enhancement (and movement!) of the existing Post Office Road pitch, development and provision of new stands and integral function and educational suites which will enable us to build on our existing and unique award winning community programmes."

Colours and badge

Colours
Featherstone's traditional playing colours are navy blue and white. They usually play in irregular navy blue and white hoops.

Badge
 
Featherstone used the town's coat of arms as their badge until 2009 when a new club crest was introduced. The new badge was less traditional with a pirate, the club's mascot and Rovers underneath in the club's colours. In 2014 the club reverted to using the town's coat of arms but had it in blue and white with the year the club was founded, 1921 within it.

2023 squad

 

Coach: 

 Sean Long

Assistant Coach(s): 

 Leon Pryce

 Ian Hardman

2022 transfers

Gains

Losses

Players

Hall of Fame
The following players have been inducted into Featherstone Rovers' Hall of Fame. The number in brackets indicates the year in which the player was inducted.

 John Keith Bridges (2003)
 Vince Farrar (2003)
 Keith Bell (2009)
 Jack "Jackie" Fennell (2009) 
 Les Tonks (2009) 
 Carl Dooler (2010)
 Deryck Fox (2010)
 David Hobbs (2010)
 Stuart Dickens (2012)
 Cliff Lambert (2014)
 Arnie Morgan (2014)
 John Newlove (2014)
 Mike Smith (2014)
 Cyril Woolford (2014)
 Paul Coventry (2015)
 Peter Fox (2015)
 Paul Newlove (2015)
 Charlie Stone (2015)
 Brendon Tuuta
 Steve Quinn
 Steve Nash (2016)
 Jimmy Thompson
 Don Fox
 Joe Mullaney
 Jim Denton
 Eric Batten
 Freddie Miller
 Peter Smith
 Jack Hirst
 Malcolm Dixon

Club captains

Coaches

{| class="wikitable sortable"
|-
! Year !! Coach !! Played !! Won !! Lost !! Drawn !! Win % !! Honours
|-

| 1921–44 || Billy Williams || 692 || 217 || 443 || 32 || 31.367% || Yorkshire Cup Winners (1940), Championship Final Runners-up (1928), Yorkshire Cup Runners-Up (1929)
|-
| 1944–45 || Aubrey Casewell ||  ||  ||  ||  ||  || –
|-
| 1945–48 || Bill Sherwood || 81 || 30 || 49 || 2 || 37.047% || –
|-
| 1947–48 || Stanley Smith || 40 || 6 || 34|| 0 || 15% || –
|-
| 1948–51 || Bill Sherwood || 123 || 35 || 82 || 6 || 28.46% || –
|-
| 1951–56 || Eric Batten || 210 || 102 || 100 || 8 || 48.57% || Challenge Cup Runners-Up (1952)
|-
| 1956–57 || Bill Hudson || 41 || 20 || 21 || 0 || 48.78% || –
|-
| 1957–63 || Harold Moxon || 264 || 164 || 91 || 9 || 62.12% || Yorkshire Cup Winners (1959)
|-
| 1963–66 || John Malpass || 123 || 66 || 55 || 2 || 53.66% || Yorkshire Cup Runners-Up (1963)
|-
| 1966–70 || Laurie Gant || 171 || 100 || 74 || 7 || 58.48% || Challenge Cup Winners (1967), Yorkshire Cup Runners-Up (1966, 1969, 1970)
|-
| 1971–74 || Peter Fox || 152|| 89 || 60 || 3 || 58.55% || Challenge Cup Winners (1973), Challenge Cup Runners-Up (1974)
Championship Runners-Up (1973)
|-
| 1974 || Tommy Smales || 7 || 3 || 4 || 0 || 42.86% || –
|-
| 1974–76 || Keith Goulding || 51 || 32 || 17 || 2 || 62.75% || –
|-
| 1976 || Thomas Smales || 16 || 11 || 4 || 1 || 68.75% || Championship Runners-Up (1976)
|-
| 1976–77 || Keith Cotton || 57 || 37 || 18 || 2 || 64.91% || Championship Winners (1977), Yorkshire Cup Runners-Up (1976, 1977)
|-
| 1977–78 || Keith Goulding || 21 || 13 || 6 || 2 || 61.90% || –
|-
| 1978 || Terry Clawson || 13 || 4 || 9 || 0 || 30.77% || –
|-
| 1978–79 || Thomas Smales || 22 || 6 || 15 || 1 || 27.27% || –
|-
| 1979–81 || Paul Daley || 54 || 35 || 17 || 2 || 64.81% || Division 2 Winners (1980)
|-
| 1981–82 || Vince Farrar || 65 || 23 || 40 || 2 || 35.38% || –
|-
| 1983–85 || Allan Agar || 104 || 45 || 53 || 6 || 43.27% || Challenge Cup Winners (1983)
|-
| 1985–86 || George Pieniazek || 37 || 11 || 22 || 4 || 29.73% || –
|-
| 1986–87 || Paul Daley || 23 || 7 || 16 || 0 || 30.43% || –
|-
| 1987–91 || Peter Fox || 152 || 80 || 66 || 6 || 52.63% || Division 2 Premiership Runners-Up (1988), Yorkshire Cup Runners-Up (1989)
|-
| 1991–92 || Allan Agar || 27 || 12 || 14 || 1 || 44.44% || –
|-
| 1992–94 || Steve Martin || 76 || 44 || 29 || 3 || 57.89% || Division 2 Winners (1993)
|-
| 1994–97 || David Ward || 80 || 38 || 39 || 3 || 47.50% || –
|-
| 1997–98 || Steve Simms || 57 || 32 || 24 || 1 || 56.14% || First Division Grand Final Runners-Up (1998)
|-
| 1998–99 || Kevin Hobbs || 18 || 9 || 9 || 0 || 50% || –
|-
| 1999–01 || Peter Roe || 80 || 53 || 23 || 4 || 66.25% || –
|-
| 2001–02 || Ian Fairhurst || 20 || 11 || 8 || 1 || 55.00% || –
|-
| 2002–03 || Andy Kelly || 48 || 27 || 21 || 0 || 56.25% || –
|-
| 2003–05 || Gary Price || 54 || 24 || 26 || 4 || 44.44% || –
|-
| 2005–08 || David Hobbs || 93 || 51 || 38 || 4 || 54.84% || National League 2 Grand Final Winners (2007)
|-
| 2008 || Danny Evans || 8 || 3 || 4 || 1 || 37.50% || –
|-
| 2008–13 || Daryl Powell || 137 || 104 || 30 || 3 || 75.91% || Championship Winners (2011), Championship League Leaders (2010, 2011, 2012)European Club Challenge Winners (2012), Championship Grand Final Runners-Up (2010, 2012)

Northern Rail Cup Runners-Up (2012)
|-
| 2013 || Ryan Sheridan || 8 || 6 || 2 || 0 || 75% || –
|-
| 2013 || Danny Evans || 8 || 6 || 2 || 0 || 75% || Championship League Leaders (2013)|-
| 2014 || John Bastian || 11 || 7 || 4 || 0 || 63.64% || –
|-
| 2014 || Danny Evans || 1 || 1 || 0 || 0 || 100% || –
|-
| 2014–15 || Andy Hay || 41 || 27 || 13 || 1 || 65.85% || Championship Grand Final Runners-Up (2014)
|-
| 2015–17 || Jon Sharp || 70 || 42 || 27 || 1 || 60% || Championship Shield Winners (2015)|-
| 2017-18 || John Duffy || 38 || 23 || 12 || 1 || 60.53% ||Championship Shield Winners (2018)|-
|2019
|Ryan Carr
|34
|21
|13
|0
|61.76%
|Championship Grand Final Runners-Up
|-
|2020-21
|James Webster
|36
|33
|3
|0
|91.67%
|Championship Grand Final Runners-Up 1895 Cup Winners (2021)|-
|2021-22
|Brian McDermott
|33
|26
|1
|6
|79%
|1895 Cup Runners Up (2022)
|}

Seasons
Super League era

Honours
League
First Division / Super LeagueWinners (1): 1976–77
Second Division / ChampionshipWinners (3): 1979–80, 1992–93, 2011
RFL Championship Leaders' ShieldWinners (4):  2010, 2011, 2012, 2013

Cups
Challenge CupWinners (3): 1966–67, 1972–73, 1982–83
RFL Yorkshire CupWinners (2):1939–40, 1959–60
RFL 1895 CupWinners: 2021

Other
Championship ShieldWinners (2)''': 2015, 2018

Sources

Notes

References

External links 
Featherstone Rovers official website
 
 
Featherstone Rovers forum on rlfans.com
 
 

 
Women's rugby league teams in England
Featherstone
English rugby league teams